Lamus may refer to:

 Lamus River
 Lamus (city), ancient city on the river
 Lamus (Isauria), town of ancient Isauria
 Lamus (see), Catholic titular see
 Eduardo Cote Lamus (1928–1964), Colombian politician and poet
 Acrossocheilus lamus, a species of ray-finned fish

See also 
 Lamos (disambiguation)
 Lamu